Woody, also spelled Woodie, is a masculine given name in its own right or a pet form of Woodrow and other names such as Elwood or Heywood. It was especially popular in the US during and after the presidency of Thomas Woodrow Wilson, who was always called by his middle name. It is also a surname.

Woody may refer to:

Given name or nickname

People
 Woody Abernathy (outfielder) (1908–1961), American baseball player
 Woody Abernathy (pitcher) (1915–1994), American baseball player
 Woody Allen (born 1935), American screenwriter and actor
 Woody Austin (born 1964), American golfer
 Woody Bennett (born 1956), American football player
 Woody Blackburn (born 1951), American golfer
 Woodie Blackman (1922–2010), Caribbean author
 Woody Bledsoe (1921–1995), American mathematician and computer scientist
 Woody Bowman (1941–2015), American politician
 Woody Bredell (1884–1976), British cinematographer and actor
 Woody Brown (actor) (born 1956), American actor
 Woody Brown (surfer) (1912–2008), American surfer and designer
 Woody Campbell (American football) (born 1944), American football player
 Woody Campbell (basketball) (1925–2004), Canadian basketball player
 Woody Crowson (1918–1947), American baseball player
 Woody Crumbo (1912–1989), Native American artist
 Woody Cunningham, American vocalist and drummer and member of Kleeer
 Woodrow Dantzler (born 1979), American football player
 Woody Davis (1913–1999), American baseball player
 Woody Deck (born 1983), American poker player
 Woody De Othello (born 1991), American ceramist, painter
 Woodie Dixon, General Counsel and Vice President of Business Affairs for the Pacific-10 Conference
 Woody Dumart (1916–2001), Canadian ice hockey player
 Woody Durham (1941–2018), American sports commentator
 Woody English (1906–1997), American baseball player
 Woody Erdman (1926–1997), American sportscaster and television producer
 Woody Evans (born 1977), American librarian and author
 Woody Fair (1914–2000), American baseball player
 Woodie Flowers (1943–2019), emeritus professor of mechanical engineering
 Woody Freeman (born 1946), American businessman and politician
 Woodie Fryman (1940–2011), Major League Baseball pitcher
 Woody Gelman (1915–1978), American cartoonist and publisher
 Woody Green (born 1951), American football player
 Woody Grimshaw (1919–1974), American basketball player and coach
 Woody Guthrie (1912–1967), American singer-songwriter and folk musician
 Woody Gwyn (born 1944), American artist
 Woody Harrelson (born 1961), American actor
 Woody Harris (1911–1985), American songwriter
 John Woodland Hastings (1927–2014), American biologist
 Woody Hayes (1913–1987), American football player and coach
 Woodie Held (1932–2009), Major League Baseball player
 Woody Herman (1913–1987), American jazz clarinetist
 Warren Hoburg (born 1985), American engineer and NASA astronaut
 Woody Holton, American historian
 Woody Huyke (born 1937), American baseball player and manager
 Woody Jackson, American musician
 Woody Jenkins (born 1947), American newspaper editor and politician
 Woody Jensen (1907–2001), American baseball player
 Woody Johnson (born 1947), American businessman and philanthropist
 Woody Jun, Korean business academic
 Woody Keeble (1917–1982), Native American U.S. Army veteran
 Woodie King, Jr. (born 1937), African-American director and producer of stage and screen
 Woody Kling (1925–1988), American television writer and producer
 Woody Lawrence, Dominican Olympic swimmer
 Woody Lee (born 1968), American singer-songwriter and country musician
 Woody Lowe (born 1954), American football player
 Woody Main (1922–1992), American baseball player
 Woody Mann, American guitarist and jazz musician
 Woody Milintachinda (born 1976), Thai radio and TV presenter
 Woody Myers (born 1954), American physician and politician
 Woody Paul (born 1949), American singer and fiddler
 Woody Paige (born 1946), American sports journalist
 Woody Peoples (1943–2010), American football player
 Woody Pirtle, American artist
 Woody Rich (1916–1983), American baseball player
 Woody Rock (born 1976), American R&B and gospel singer and member of Dru Hill
 Woodie Salmon (born 1952), American politician
 Woody Sauldsberry (1935–2007), American basketball player
 Woody Sedlacek (1919–2004), American racehorse trainer
 Woody Shaw (1944–1989), American trumpeter and jazz musician
 Woody Smith (1927–2005), American baseball player and manager
 Woody Spring (born 1944), United States Army colonel and astronaut
 Woody Stephens (1913–1998), American racehorse trainer
 Woody Strode (1914–1994), American sportsman and actor
 Woody Sullivan (born 1944), American physicist and astronomer
 Woody Upchurch (1911–1971), American baseball player
 Woody van Amen (born 1936), Dutch visual artist
 W. S. Van Dyke (1889–1943), American film director
 Woody Vasulka (1937–2019), Czech-American video artist
 Woody Wagenhorst (1863–1946), American football and baseball player and coach
 Woody Weatherman (born 1965), American guitarist and member of Corrosion of Conformity
 Woody Wheaton (1914–1995), American baseball player
 Woodie W. White (born 1935), United Methodist Church bishop
 Woody Widenhofer (1943–2020), American football coach
 Hershel W. Williams (1923–2022), United States Marine and Medal of Honor recipient
 Woody Williams (born 1966), American baseball player
 Woody Williams (infielder) (1912–1995), American baseball player
 Woody Williams (pitcher, born 1918) (1918–1990), American Negro league baseball pitcher
 Woody Wilson, American bass guitar player and member of Alive N Kickin'
 Ronnie Wood (born 1947), British guitarist and member of the Rolling Stones
 Stuart "Woody" Wood (born 1957), Scottish guitarist and member of the Bay City Rollers
 Woody Woodard (c. 1917–1996), American football coach
 Woody Woodbury (born 1924), American comedian and actor
 Dan Woodgate (born 1960), British drummer and member of Madness
 Woody Woodmansey (born 1950), British drummer known for his work with David Bowie
 Woody Woodward (born 1942), American baseball player and general manager

Fictional characters
 Woody Woodpecker, in short cartoons by the Walter Lantz animation studio and Universal Pictures
 Sheriff Woody, protagonist of the Toy Story franchise
 Woodrow Wilson 'Woody' Hoyt, a police detective in the TV series Crossing Jordan
 Woody Boyd, in the TV series Cheers
 Woody Fink, in the TV show The Suite Life on Deck
 Woody Goodman, in the TV series Veronica Mars
 Larry "Woody" Woodhouse, in the Australian soap opera Neighbours
 Lazarus Long, science-fiction character born Woodrow Wilson Smith and called "Woody" by his own family

Surname
 Alanah Woody (1956–2007), American archaeologist and anthropologist
 Allen Woody (1955–2000), American bass guitarist and member of The Allman Brothers Band and Gov't Mule
 Arthur Woody (1884–1946), American forest ranger
 Damien Woody (born 1977), American football player
 Elizabeth Woody (born 1959), Native American artist
 Frank H. Woody (1833–1912), American politician and judge
 Joey Woody (born 1973), American track and field athlete
 Larry Woody, American sports writer
 Russ Woody, American author and television producer

See also
 Woody (disambiguation)

English-language masculine given names
Lists of people by nickname
Hypocorisms
English masculine given names